Klapý is a municipality and village in Litoměřice District in the Ústí nad Labem Region of the Czech Republic. It has about 500 inhabitants.

Geography

It lies in a flat agricultural landscape of the Lower Eger Table from which the Hazmburk hill rises in the eastern part of the municipality.

Sights
There is a ruin of a medieval castle on the Hazmburk hill.

Notable people
Lubor J. Zink (1920–2003), Czech-Canadian writer

References

Villages in Litoměřice District